Ronald Victor Hines (11 July 1923 – 6 January 2019) was an Australian rules footballer who played with Carlton in the Victorian Football League (VFL).

Notes

External links 

Ron Hines's profile at Blueseum

1923 births
Carlton Football Club players
Royal Australian Air Force personnel of World War II
Australian rules footballers from Ballarat
2019 deaths